Kinnitty GAA is a Gaelic Athletic Association club located in Kinnitty, County Offaly, Republic of Ireland. The club is a member of the Offaly GAA County Board. The club is almost exclusively concerned with hurling.

Achievements
 Offaly Senior Hurling Championship Winners (9) 1920, 1923, 1930, 1967, 1978, 1979, 1983, 1984, 1985
 Offaly Junior A Hurling Championship Winners (7) 1916, 1917, 1966, 1986, 1993, 2000, 2020

Notable players
 Liam Carroll
 Mark Corrigan
 Paddy Corrigan
 Ger Coughlan
 Pat Delaney
 Johnny Flaherty

References

Gaelic games clubs in County Offaly
Hurling clubs in County Offaly